Magic Triangle is the eleventh album by the trumpeter Dave Douglas. It was released on the Arabesque label in 1998 and contains performances by Douglas, Chris Potter, James Genus, and Ben Perowsky.

Reception
The AllMusic review by Scott Yanow stated: "Falling between hard bop and avant-garde jazz, the music tugs and pushes at the boundaries of the modern mainstream. Douglas varies the tempos and moods from piece to piece, giving listeners not only expertly played performances but a constantly flowing program. Although none of the individual selections have themes that will stay in one's mind after the CD has ended, the solos are consistently strong, the musicians blend together well, and the ensembles are colorful. Well worth exploring".

Track listing
 "Everyman" - 4:17
 "Magic Triangle" - 8:20
 "Padded Cell" - 6:30
 "Circular" - 8:16
 "Kisangani" - 6:14
 "Barrage" - 3:33
 "Odalisque" - 7:14
 "Coaster" - 4:08
 "The Ghost" - 7:56
All compositions by Dave Douglas
Recorded at Systems Two, Brooklyn on May 12 & 13, 1997

Personnel
Dave Douglas – trumpet
Chris Potter – tenor saxophone
James Genus – bass
Ben Perowsky – drums

References

1997 albums
Dave Douglas (trumpeter) albums
Arabesque Records albums